Saprino is a rural locality (a selo) in Vitebskoye Rural Settlement, Podgorensky District, Voronezh Oblast, Russia. The population was 447 as of 2010. There are 11 streets.

Geography 
Saprino is located 24 km east of Podgorensky (the district's administrative centre) by road. Kurennoye is the nearest rural locality.

References 

Rural localities in Podgorensky District